Anna Fison known as Morfudd Eryri and Anna Walter Thomas (14 February 1839 – 12 February 1920) was a British translator, poet and educator. She had an interest in fairy tales and an enthusiasm for Welsh culture.

Life
Fison was born in Suffolk in 1839 as the last of twenty children born to Thomas Fison and his second wife, Charlotte. She and her siblings were keen on fairy tales despite the disapproval of her parents. They would tell tales about fairies including Tom Tit Tot and Cap o'Rushes. She was educated well both in Europe and in London, and she took a strong interest in languages whilst living with one of her brothers in Oxford. There she met Charles Williams of Jesus College who passed on to her his enthusiasm for Eisteddfods and the Welsh language.

In 1851 she married David Walter Thomas and they brought their four children up in the Welsh culture while living at Bangor. Their children included Evan Lorimer Thomas. Fison was an enthusiast for education and she organised evening classes for the local quarryman. She taught herself Welsh and wrote poetry. She got to hear of the research being undetaken by the folklorist Charles Hindis Groome about stories of Suffolk. She wrote to him and told him of the stories from her childhood including the Rumpelstiltskin-type story Tom Tit Tot and the Cinderella type story Cap O Rushes. These stories were later taken up by Edward Clodd.

Fison was part of the movement who hoped to redesign the Welsh Eisteddfods during the 1870s and the 1880s. Her bardic name was Morfudd Eryri. In 1883 she attended the National Eisteddfod in Cardiff and she won a prize for her poem, written in English, about Llandaff. Her poem about the death of Prince Abert for the Eisteddfod was said to have got Queen Victoria to ask for 100 copies.

She did translation work of noted works into and out of Welsh and also from German. In 1884, she was considered as a candidate for the Modern Languages chair at the University College of North Wales in Bangor, but she was not chosen.

Her husband died in 1905.

Fison died in Dyffryn Ardudwy in 1920.

References

1839 births
1920 deaths
Writers from Bangor, Gwynedd
Welsh poets
Linguists